Hermann Fehling may refer to:

 Hermann von Fehling (1812–1885), German chemist
 Hermann Fehling (physician) (1847–1925), German obstetrician and gynecologist